The EDP Sarichioi Wind Farm is a wind power project in Sarichioi, Tulcea County, Romania. It has 11 Vestas V90 wind turbines with a nominal output of around 3 MW which will deliver up to 33 MW of power, enough to power over 21,500 homes, with a capital investment required of approximately US$50 million.

References

Wind farms in Romania